Juan Bizama was a Chilean sports shooter. He competed in two events at the 1952 Summer Olympics.

References

Year of birth missing
Possibly living people
Chilean male sport shooters
Olympic shooters of Chile
Shooters at the 1952 Summer Olympics
Pan American Games silver medalists for Chile
Pan American Games bronze medalists for Chile
Pan American Games medalists in shooting
Place of birth missing
Shooters at the 1951 Pan American Games
Medalists at the 1951 Pan American Games
20th-century Chilean people